Doha Festival City is a  shopping mall based in Qatar, owned by Bawabat Al Shamal Real Estate W.L.L (BASREC), with  of leasable space, it is the largest operating mall in Qatar as of 2018 operated by Al Futtaim. Located north of the capital Doha in Umm Salal Mohammed, near the Al Shamal Road.

Currently home to IKEA it is home to over 200 international brands, and the world's largest Monoprix Hypermarket. It is also home to the Middle East's first NBA Store.

Doha Festival City is a destination with a world-class entertainment complex, and will be home to indoor and outdoor attractions unique to Qatar. This comprehensive mix of entertainment – from Qatar’s first VOX 4D cinema complex with 18 digital screens to an Outdoor Leisure Trail space for exercise and cycling – is designed to appeal to all ages.

Doha Festival City is the first fully certified sustainable mall in Qatar (Certification by GORD), receiving a 3-star GSAS Design & Build certification by the Gulf Organization for Research and Development (GORD).

The mall was built at a cost of QR6 billion (~$1.6 billion), and opened on April 5, 2017.

References 

Shopping malls in Doha